Li Di An (born 1983), known by her given name Di An (笛安), is a Chinese author. She was born in the Shanxi Province to parents Li Rui and Jiang Yun, who are both writers. Di An holds a master's degree in sociology from École des hautes études en sciences sociales in Paris and is best known for her book Ashes to Ashes.

Bibliography
Ashes to Ashes
Memory in the city of Dragon (2009) 
Memory in the city of Dragon II (2010)

References

1983 births
Living people
Short story writers from Shanxi
People from Taiyuan
Chinese women novelists
Shanxi University alumni
People's Republic of China novelists
21st-century Chinese short story writers
Chinese women short story writers
21st-century Chinese women writers
People's Republic of China short story writers